Kullakar rice is an ancient rice variety, grown primarily in India. It is one of the red rice varieties which grows in the South Indian state of Tamil Nadu, India.

This rice is indigenous to India. It grows in sandy clay or clayey sand, and requires 100 -110 days to grow. Fully grown crops reach 100cm. Different varieties have adapted themselves to different land conditions, from alkaline soil to saline soils, and from drought prone areas to waterlogged areas.

This rice is suitable for making Idli, Dosa and Congee.

Kullakar Rice Dishes 

 Kullakar Red Rice Paniyaram
 Kullakar Red Rice Noodles
 Red Rice sweet Payasam
 Red Rice Poha
 Red Rice vermicelli
 Idli
 Dosa
 Khichdi

See also
Traditional rice varieties of Tamil Nadu
Health benefits of Kullakar Rice

References

Rice varieties
Tamil cuisine
Agriculture in Tamil Nadu
Rice production in India